Artyom Vitalyevich Anisimov (born 30 January 1991) is a former Russian footballer.

Career
Anisimov made his professional debut for FC Saturn Ramenskoye on 14 July 2010 in the Russian Cup game against FC Sakhalin Yuzhno-Sakhalinsk.

External links
 
 
 Player page on the official FC Saturn Moscow Oblast website 
 

1991 births
Sportspeople from Saratov
Living people
Russian footballers
Association football midfielders
FC Saturn Ramenskoye players
FC Volga Nizhny Novgorod players